Curt Russell Lyons (born October 17, 1974) is an American former professional baseball player.

External links
Baseballcube.com profile
Baseball-reference.com profile

1974 births
Living people
Cincinnati Reds players
Chattanooga Lookouts players
Iowa Cubs players
Akron Aeros players
Major League Baseball pitchers
Baseball players from Indiana
Atlantic City Surf players
Yuma Bullfrogs players
People from Greencastle, Indiana
Billings Mustangs players
Charleston Wheelers players
Gulf Coast Yankees players
Orlando Rays players
Princeton Reds players
Winston-Salem Warthogs players